Lynn Whitfield (née Smith; born February 15, 1953) is an American actress. She began her acting career in television and theatre before progressing to supporting roles in film. She won a Primetime Emmy Award for Outstanding Lead Actress in a Limited Series or Movie and received a Golden Globe Award nomination for her breakout performance as Josephine Baker in the HBO biographical film The Josephine Baker Story (1991).

In the 1990s, Whitfield played leading roles in a number of made-for-television movies and had several starring roles in theatrical films, including A Thin Line Between Love and Hate (1996), Gone Fishin' (1997), Eve's Bayou (1997), Stepmom (1998), Head of State (2003), Madea's Family Reunion (2006), and The Women (2008). Whitfield also starred in a number of movies in the 2000s and 2010s. From 2016 to 2020, she starred as Lady Mae Greenleaf in the Oprah Winfrey Network dramatic series Greenleaf, for which she won critical acclaim and garnered two NAACP Image Awards and a Gracie Award. Whitfield has won a total of seven NAACP Image Awards.

Early life
 
Whitfield was born in Baton Rouge, Louisiana, the daughter of Jean (née Butler), a former president of the Louisiana Housing Finance Agency, and Dr. Valerian Smith, who was also a composer who wrote the musicals, The Supper and The Wake. Her mother is a founding member of the Baton Rouge chapter of The Links Incorporated and is a member of Alpha Kappa Alpha sorority. Whitfield is an honorary member of Alpha Kappa Alpha Sorority Incorporated. She is the eldest of four children and a third-generation BFA graduate from Howard University. Both parents were instrumental in developing Whitfield's initial interest in acting, as they were actively involved in the Baton Rouge art scene. Her love of movies was shared by her maternal grandmother, Estelle Devall Butler, who exposed her to them. By age five, Whitfield decided she wanted to be in them.

Career

1970s 
Following graduation, she first garnered attention on the stage by performing with the Black Repertory Company in Washington, D.C. She married playwright/director/actor Vantile Whitfield, one of the company's co-founders and a pioneer of black theatre, in 1974. She eventually moved to New York and appeared off-Broadway in such shows as The Great Macdaddy and Showdown Time before earning international acclaim touring the United States, Australia and London's West End in the 1977 production of the landmark play "for colored girls who have considered suicide / when the rainbow is enuf" alongside Alfre Woodard.

1980s
Whitfield made her professional screen debut in 1981 as Jill Thomas in the critically acclaimed NBC serial drama Hill Street Blues. In 1983, she appeared in the comedy film Doctor Detroit (1983), playing the supporting role of Thelma Cleland. She later co-starred in the films The Slugger's Wife, Silverado, and Jaws: The Revenge. She also starred in the television films The George McKenna Story opposite Denzel Washington and Johnnie Mae Gibson: FBI as the title character and in the ABC miniseries The Women of Brewster Place alongside Oprah Winfrey and Cicely Tyson). She also was a regular cast member in the short-lived 1988 ABC female-driven medical drama series HeartBeat alongside Kate Mulgrew, Laura Johnson, and Gail Strickland.

1990s

Whitfield achieved wide recognition in the title role of The Josephine Baker Story (1991), portraying the American who became a Folies Bergère star, a French Resistance fighter during World War II, and a civil rights activist. The HBO biopic required her to age from 18 to 68. After a highly publicized casting call, Whitfield was chosen over hundreds of women. In the movie, she appeared nude on-screen. In his review, Ken Tucker of Entertainment Weekly said: "Whitfield is exceptionally good as the legendary singer-dancer who came to prominence in the ’20s for her throaty singing and her notorious "banana dance"—a wiggly little number executed while wearing nothing except a skirt of real bananas." The New York Times added that Whitfield "powerfully captures her [Baker's] passionate determination." Whitfield won a Primetime Emmy Award for Outstanding Lead Actress in a Miniseries or a Movie for her role, and said this gave her "the greatest sense of accomplishment and realization of my vision. It absolutely called upon everything I thought I could do at that point." She also received a Golden Globe Award for Best Actress – Miniseries or Television Film nomination and won the NAACP Image Award for Outstanding Actress in a Television Movie, Mini-Series or Dramatic Special.

After her breakthrough as Josephine Baker, Whitfield had the recurring role in the ABC legal drama Equal Justice, appearing opposite Joe Morton. She continued her career, starring in the made-for-television movies A Triumph of the Heart: The Ricky Bell Story (1991); Stompin' at the Savoy (1992) with Vanessa L. Williams, Jasmine Guy, and Vanessa Bell Calloway; Taking the Heat (1993) with Tony Goldwyn; State of Emergency (1994) with Joe Mantegna; Sophie and the Moonhanger (1996); The Wedding (1998), as Halle Berry's mother; The Color of Courage (1998) alongside Linda Hamilton; and Deep in My Heart (1999) opposite Anne Bancroft. She also had a regular role on the short-lived NBC detective series The Cosby Mysteries from 1994 to 1995 and later guest-starred on Martin and Touched by an Angel.

In 1996, Whitfield was cast as the female lead opposite Martin Lawrence in the dark romantic comedy film A Thin Line Between Love and Hate. At the time of filming, Lawrence was 12 years younger than Whitfield, who was then 42. The film grossed over $35 million against a budget of $8 million. In 1997, she co-starred opposite Danny Glover and Rosanna Arquette in the comedy film Gone Fishin', appeared in the supporting role in the Canadian drama The Planet of Junior Brown, and played the mother of Jurnee Smollett's title character in the critically acclaimed independent drama Eve's Bayou. In 1998, Whitfield had supporting role of an oncologist in the comedy-drama film Stepmom.

2000s—present

In the 2000s, Whitfield had many supporting roles on television and in films. She co-starred in the Chris Rock comedy film Head of State (2003) and Tyler Perry's Madea's Family Reunion (2006). Whitfield also appeared in The Women (2008), The Rebound (2009), and Mama, I Want to Sing (2011) and had many roles in low-profile B-movies. She also starred as Dorothea Garibaldi in the Disney Channel films The Cheetah Girls and The Cheetah Girls 2.

On television, Whitfield had recurring roles on Boston Public and Without a Trace in the 2000s. From 2014 to 2015, she appeared in the ABC legal drama How to Get Away with Murder as villainous Mary Walker. She also had a recurring role on Hit the Floor and appeared as the abusive mother of April (Rochelle Aytes) on Mistresses.

In 2015, Whitfield was cast as the main villain in Greenleaf, the Oprah Winfrey Network original scripted drama series about the unscrupulous world of the Greenleaf family and their sprawling Memphis megachurch. Whitfield played the leading role of Lady Mae Greenleaf, the imperious minister's wife and the power- and money-hungry matriarch of the family. The series also starred Keith David, Merle Dandridge, Kim Hawthorne, and Oprah Winfrey. Whitfield received positive reviews from critics for her performance. One critic stated: "Whitfield has the imperious aura of a grand soap opera diva in the tradition of Joan Collins." She won the NAACP Image Award for Outstanding Supporting Actress in a Drama Series in 2019 and 2020 as well as the Gracie Award for Outstanding Female Actor in a Supporting Role in a Drama Series in 2017. The series ended in 2020 after five seasons and 60 episodes. Whitfield later was cast in a leading role in Greenleaf'''s planned spinoff.

In 2018, Whitfield co-starred opposite Sanaa Lathan in the romantic comedy film Nappily Ever After, which was released on Netflix. She guest-starred as Shaunette Renée Wilson's mother, a famous Nigerian surgeon, on the Fox medical drama The Resident in 2019. In 2021, she co-starred in the comedy film Vacation Friends. In 2022, she set to appear opposite Nicolas Cage and Ron Perlman in the action comedy film, The Retirement Plan''.

Personal life

Whitfield has been married twice. Her first husband, from 1974 to 1978, was Vantile Whitfield. From 1990 to 1992, she was married to director Brian Gibson, with whom she had a daughter, Grace.

Filmography

Film

Television

Awards and nominations

References

External links

1953 births
Actresses from Baton Rouge, Louisiana
African-American actresses
American film actresses
American television actresses
Howard University alumni
Living people
Louisiana Creole people
Outstanding Performance by a Lead Actress in a Miniseries or Movie Primetime Emmy Award winners
20th-century American actresses
21st-century American actresses
20th-century African-American women
20th-century African-American people
21st-century African-American women
21st-century African-American people